Ariostralis nebulosa is a species of air-breathing land slug, a terrestrial, pulmonate, gastropod mollusk in the family Oopeltidae.

Distribution
This is a species of non-marine mollusc found in South Africa only.

Ecology 
A. nebulosa is readily found throughout the whole year.

A. nebulosa serves as the first intermediate host for a parasite, the brachylaimid trematode Renylaima capensis. Branched, cercariogenous sporocysts of this parasite massively develop in A. nebulosa. These sporocysts are attached to the hepatopancreas, body wall, pallial floor and even to the genital system. This fluke is highly specific at the first intermediate host level.

The forest shrew (Myosorex varius) is a predator of A. nebulosa. There is a possible direct infection of the shrew by the cercariae of R. capensis.

References

This article incorporates CC-BY-2.0 text from the reference "Life Cycle of Renylaima capensis", by Sirgel, Artigas, Bargues & Mas-Coma, 2012.

Endemic fauna of South Africa
Oopeltidae
Gastropods described in 1985